Edmonton-Highlands-Beverly was a provincial electoral district in Alberta, Canada, mandated to return a single member to the Legislative Assembly of Alberta using the first past the post method of voting from 1993 to 1997.

Edmonton-Highlands-Beverly was contested only once, in 1993. It was created from most of Edmonton-Highlands and part of Edmonton-Beverly, and its name was changed back to Edmonton-Highlands in 1997, with no boundary changes.

Representation history

The district's only MLA was one-term Liberal member Alice Hanson. She served in opposition and did not run again when the riding was abolished in 1997.

Election results

See also
List of Alberta provincial electoral districts

References

Further reading

External links
Elections Alberta
The Legislative Assembly of Alberta

Former provincial electoral districts of Alberta